Diana is a public art work designed by American artist Dick Wiken and carved by Adoph Roegner, located in downtown Milwaukee, Wisconsin. The carved limestone depicts the Roman goddess Diana seated and surrounded by fish, cattails and a unicorn. It was located on the facade of the Milwaukee Athletic Club but has since been removed and sold to a private collector.

References

Outdoor sculptures in Milwaukee
1954 sculptures
Limestone sculptures in Wisconsin
1954 establishments in Wisconsin
Sculptures of Artemis
Fish in art